Sharon Kao (born 22 August 1991) is a Taiwanese actress. She is mixed with Bunun descent (Austronesian) and Chinese.
In 2006, she starred in a TV series Curly Hair produced by Public Television Service Taiwan. She starred in Leaving Gracefully in 2011. In 2014, she made a cameo appearance in Lucy as a TV News Reporter which directed by Luc Besson. In 2016, she starred in Lokah Laqi and won Best New Talent at the 18th Taipei Film Awards. She got married in 2017 in California. Her aunt is a famous Taiwanese Singer Sammi Kao.

Filmography

Film

Television series

Animation Shows

References

External links 

 
 

1991 births
Living people
21st-century Taiwanese actresses
Taiwanese film actresses
Taiwanese television actresses
Taiwanese voice actresses
Actresses from Taipei
Bunun people